Laius is a genus of soft-winged flower beetles belonging to the family Melyridae, subfamily Malachiinae.

Selected species
 Laius alleni Lea, 1909
 Laius asahinai Nakane, 1955
 Laius lutaoensis Yoshitomi & Lee, 2010
 Laius miyamotoi Nakane, 1955
 Laius pici Miwa, 1931
 Laius purpureipennis Lea, 1916
 Laius taiwanus Yoshitomi & Lee, 2010
 Laius tibialis Gahan, 1900
 Laius triangulatus Wittmer, 1954

References 

Melyridae
Cleroidea genera